His Excellency from Madagascar is a 1922 German silent thriller film directed by Georg Jacoby and starring Paul Otto, Eva May, and Georg Alexander. It was released in two parts Das Mädchen aus der Fremde and Stubbs, der Detektiv.

The film's sets were designed by the art director Robert Neppach.

Cast
Paul Otto
Eva May
Georg Alexander
Alfred Gerasch
Julius Falkenstein
Sophie Pagay
Johanna Ewald
Paul Biensfeldt
Ellen Plessow
Henry Bender
Emil Rameau
Charles Puffy

References

External links

1922 films
Films of the Weimar Republic
Films directed by Georg Jacoby
German silent feature films
1920s thriller films
German thriller films
UFA GmbH films
German black-and-white films
Silent thriller films
1920s German films